Sabha, or Sebha , is an oasis city in southwestern Libya, approximately  south of Tripoli. It was historically the capital of the Fezzan region and the Fezzan-Ghadames Military Territory and is now capital of the Sabha District. Sabha Air Base, south of the city, is a Libyan Air Force installation that is home to multiple MiG-25 aircraft.

Sabha was where the erstwhile ruler of Libya, Muammar Gaddafi, grew up and received secondary education and where he also later became involved in political activism. After the Libyan Civil War and the resultant instability in the country, Sabha reportedly grew in importance as a slave auctioning town. However, an investigation by the National Commission for Human Rights in Libya (NCHRL) revealed that while there was illegal slavery, reports were exaggerated, as slave auctions were rare and not made public. The city was seized by forces loyal to the Libyan National Army (LNA) and its leader Khalifa Haftar in January 2019, but some politicians in the area switched their loyalty to the Government of National Accord (GNA) in May 2020.

History 
In historical times, Sabha was a major centre of the Libyan caravan trade. Sabha Oasis, near Sabha, was the test site of OTRAG rockets, after launching was no longer possible in Shaba North in Zaire (now Democratic Republic of Congo). It was also a remote test site for the Soviet Space program from 1984 to 1991.

In a 2004 report by the International Atomic Energy Agency, the Sabha base was linked with Libya's nuclear weapons program. In September 2011, Anti-Gaddafi forces seized Sabha as part of the Fezzan campaign. No sign of a nuclear weapons program was found.

In April 2017, BBC reported that there was a slave market for African migrants in Sabha.

In January 2019, forces loyal to Libyan National Army (LNA) leader Khalifa Haftar launched an operation to take control of Sabha and were able to enter the city by the end of the month. On January 29, 2019, it was announced that Haftar successfully captured Sabha. In February 2019, Haftar's forces were spotted patrolling the city's neighborhoods. By May 2, 2020, politicians and activists loyal to the Tripoli-based government had announced their support of the GNA, and the city is currently under the control of pro-GNA municipal governments.

Climate 

Sabha has a hot desert climate (Köppen climate classification BWh). Summers are very hot, with temperatures reaching 40ºC regularly. Winters are mild with a high diurnal temperature variation. There is hardly any precipitation in the year with low (32%) humidity, but sunshine is abundant throughout the year.

Landmarks 
Sabha is famous for the Fort Elena castle, which is the castle featured on the reverse of the ten dinars banknote of Libya. Fort Elena was previously known as Fortezza Margherita, built during the Italian colonial period. Currently the Italian-built fort is a military institution. Sabha University is situated in the city. It has been involved with field studies in the desert. There are numerous irrigation canals, which are used to provide freshwater for growing crops.

Transport 
The city is served by Sabha Airport, which underwent expansion in the late 1970s.

Reports of slave auctions 
In 2017, The United Nations Migration Agency reported that Sabha had turned into a modern-day slave auctioning town. Each slave (mostly migrants from countries to the south of Libya, especially Nigeria) was sold for around US$325, with reports up to 1000 such sales each month. While this aspect of Sabha had been kept under check during the reign of Muammar Gaddaffi, it raised its head again due to the turbulence in Libya caused by the civil war. Most of the migrants came here escaping equally tragic conditions back home in Burkina Faso, Nigeria and other neighbouring African countries. However, the National Commission for Human Rights in Libya (NCHRL) revealed that the media reports of slavery were exaggerated and that slave auctions were not public, as suggested by CNN. The slave auctions which were discovered were revealed to be rare.

See also 

 List of cities in Libya
 Railway stations in Libya
 2012 Sabha conflict

Notes

References

External links 

 
 Sabha map at WikiMapia

 
Populated places in Sabha District
Baladiyat of Libya